Give It to You may refer to:

"Give It to You" (Eve song), 2007
"Give It to You" (Jordan Knight song), 1999
"Give It to You" (Martha Wash song), 1993
"Give It 2 You", a 1994 song by Da Brat
"Give It 2 U", a 2013 song by Robin Thicke